Ishtiaq Ahmad (اﺸﺘﻴﺎﻖ اﺤﻤﺩ in Urdu), (1941 – 17 November 2015) was a Pakistani fiction writer famous for his spy and detective novels in the Urdu language, particularly the Inspector Jamshaid series. He was born in Karnal now in India. Then his family migrated to city Jhang in Pakistan He was influenced by the Urdu fiction writer Ibn-e-Safi.

Novels 

 Aik Arab Dollars Ka Mansuba
 Begal mission
 Chuhay Daan
 Jinn Boss
 Waadi e Marjaan
 Dusri Khala
 File Number 119
 Batooma Kay Shaitaan
 Sonay Ka Ghoda
 Jazeeray Ka Samundar
 Daldal Ka Samundar
 اڑن طشتری کا تجربہ
 Packet ka raaz (In two editions)
 Un kai karnamay
 Gaar ka sammundar
 Chupa rustam
 
 Yashoma or surkh teer
 Surkh teer ka shikar
 Surkh teer ka kaidi
 Surkh teer ke waadi mai
 Jungle mai cheek
 Daku ka khauf
 Purasarar wardatai
 Maut ka khail
 Bhai jan ki talash
 Dhokay kay Pahar
 Yoda par hamla
 Mout ke Soudagar
 Jin + Sheitan
 Khatarnak 10
 Sarlaas
 Fartan'la
 Tasweer ka Qatal
 Purisrar Aaqa
 Mukhlis Qatil
 Barf k us paar
 Abzaal
 Fridge Ki Talaash 
 Ungli ki Qeemat 
 Purasarar Mehman
 Apni Laash
 Blackmailer
 Asharfy Ka Raaz
 Farooq Ki Rooh
 Dosra Mujrim
 Pistol Ka Aghwa
 Bawarchi Khane Main Laash
 Saumandar ka Tohfa
 Khouf ke Shikaar

Career
He started his career by writing short stories for children and then wrote his first novel in 1973. He was at his peak of popularity in the 1970s to 1990s when paper printed novels were most read. He was famous due to his Inspector Jamshed novels, Inspector Kamran Mirza novels, and Shoki Brothers novels, and sometimes a combination of all three  As of 2014, he was an editor of the magazine  (novel for children) and writing novels for Atlantis Publications, Karachi. Ishtiaq Ahmed was among the first to write Urdu fiction for children in Pakistan.

His most famous novels include Sunehri Chatan, Jazeeray Ka Samandar, Dairay Ka Samanadar, Jeraal Series, Duniya ke us Paar, Sone ka Jahaaz

Ishtiaq Ahmad has authored hundreds of suspense thriller novels in Urdu for children which include characters such as Inspector Jamshed, Inspector Kamran Mirza as well as the Shoki brothers. He had written nearly 800 spy and detective novels during his writing career.

Death
He died on 17 November 2015 at Karachi International Airport on his way back to Lahore. He was waiting to board a plane after attending Karachi International Book Fair held at Karachi Expo Centre. His cause of death was a serious Heart Attack. Among his survivors were his wife, five sons and three daughters. He is buried in his hometown  Jhang.

See also
Ashfaq Ahmad

References

External links
 Famous Writer Ishtiaq Ahmad Passes Away at 74
 Ishtiaq Ahmad, author of Inspector Jamshed Series - Interview on GEO TV, Pakistan on YouTube

1944 births
2015 deaths
Pakistani spy fiction writers
Pakistani novelists
People from Jhang District
Writers from Lahore